Brian Parker may refer to:

 Brian Parker (American football) (born 1992), American football tight end
 Brian Parker (Australian footballer) (1944–2001), Australian rules footballer
 Brian Parker (politician) (born 1950s), English politician